Choi Sung-Hwan  is a South Korean football defender, who plays for Gyeongnam FC in K League Challenge. His previous club was Daegu FC, Suwon Samsung Bluewings, Ulsan Hyundai and Gwangju FC.

External links 

1981 births
Living people
Association football defenders
South Korean footballers
Daegu FC players
Suwon Samsung Bluewings players
Ulsan Hyundai FC players
Gwangju FC players
Gyeongnam FC players
K League 1 players
K League 2 players
Footballers from Seoul